Natú ( Peagaxinan) is an extinct language of eastern Brazil. It was originally spoken on the Ipanema River in the Cariri area near present-day Porto Real do Colégio.

Vocabulary
Loukotka (1968) lists the following basic vocabulary items.

{| class="wikitable"
! gloss !! Natú
|-
| tooth || tul'usoː
|-
| man || pikuaː
|-
| sun || kra-shuloː
|-
| moon || kra-uáve
|-
| earth || atiseːreː
|-
| tobacco || barí
|}

Natu as spoken by Natu caboclos in Colégio, Alagoas:

{| class="wikitable sortable"
! Portuguese gloss (original) !! English gloss (translated) !! Natu
|-
| estréla || star || iroinkó
|-
| fogo || fire || shakishá
|-
| água || water || kraunã
|-
| Rio São Francisco || São Francisco River || Opára
|-
| cachimbo || smoking pipe || katuká
|-
| cachimbo cerimonial || ceremonial pipe || kuzipé
|-
| maracá || maraca || shishiá
|-
| dinheiro || money || meré
|-
| mulher || woman || pikwá
|-
| gente estranha || strangers || zitók
|-
| boi || ox || krazó
|-
| ovelha || sheep || sêprun
|-
| jacaré || alligator || gozê
|-
| jaboti || red-footed tortoise or yellow-footed tortoise || kati
|-
| mandioca || manioc || grogó
|-
| feijão || bean || ma, tsaká
|-
| tabaco, fumo || tobacco, smoke || bazé
|}

References 

 
 Nimuendajú, Curt: Lista comparativa com 19 itens Natu. Pasta nº. 6 del Archivo da Sala Lingüística del Departamento de Antropología del Museo Nacional, Río de Janeiro.
 Oliveira, Carlos Estevão de. mss. e informações. Rev. Mus. Paul, 17. São Paulo, 1931.
 Pompeu Sobrinho, Th. (1958): Línguas Tapuias desconhecidas do Nordeste. Boletim de Antropologia, 2(1). Fortaleza, 1958. (Lista vocabular nº 4, com 17 itens).

Extinct languages of South America
Unclassified languages of South America
Indigenous languages of Northeastern Brazil